Major General Sir Edmund Hakewill-Smith,  (17 March 1896 – 15 April 1986) was a senior British Army officer who served in both the First and Second World Wars.

Early life and First World War
Hakewill-Smith was born in Kimberley, Cape Colony, on 17 March 1896. He was educated at the Diocesan College ("Bishops") in Rondebosch, Cape Town, and, during the First World War, he went to England to attend the Royal Military College, Sandhurst, where he was commissioned as a second lieutenant into the Royal Scots Fusiliers, a line infantry regiment of the British Army, on 16 June 1915. He served with the 2nd (Regular) Battalion of his regiment on the Western Front, where he was wounded twice and, during the final Hundred Days Offensive in the latter half of 1918, was awarded the Military Cross. The citation for the award read:

Between the wars
After the war Hakewill-Smith remained in the army and served with the British Military Mission to South Russia in 1920. In 1921 he was aide-de-camp to Lawrence Dundas, 2nd Marquess of Zetland (Governor of Bengal, India). He later served as an adjutant to the 2nd Battalion, Royal Scots Fusiliers between 1927 and 1930, and was a student at the Staff College, Quetta from 1932 to 1933. He later served on the staff of the War Office from 1934 to 1936.

Second World War
During the Second World War, Hakewill-Smith served as Commanding Officer (CO) of the 5th Battalion, Devonshire Regiment, for several months from May 1940 and, from September that year, as the CO of the 4th/5th Battalion, Royal Scots Fusiliers, as an acting lieutenant colonel. He was promoted to temporary brigadier on 30 March 1941, and commanded the 157th Infantry Brigade until late March 1942, when he was promoted to the acting rank of major-general. He then became Director of Organization at the War Office, before assuming command of the 155th Infantry Brigade in mid-February 1943. On 26 December, after his major-general's rank was made temporary, he assumed command of the mountain warfare-trained 52nd (Lowland) Infantry Division from Major General Neil Ritchie as its General Officer Commanding (GOC). He commanded the 52nd Division during the last few months of the campaign in North-West Europe from October 1944 until May 1945.

Hakewill-Smith was appointed a Commander of the Order of the British Empire in 1944 and a Companion of the Order of the Bath in 1945. He served as the Honorary Colonel of the Royal Scots Fusiliers from 1946 to 1957.

Postwar
After the war, Hakewill-Smith commanded the Lowland District in Scotland before serving as President of the Military Court for War Crimes Trial of German Field Marshal Albert Kesselring. He retired from the army in 1949.

In addition, he served at Windsor Castle as a Military Knight of Windsor, later being appointed Lieutenant Governor of the castle (1964–1972) and was created a Knight Commander of the Royal Victorian Order in 1967. He died in Kingston upon Thames, Surrey in 1986 at the age of 90.

References

Bibliography

External links
British Army Officers 1939–1945
Generals of World War II
Major-General Edmund Hakewill-Smith

|-

1896 births
1986 deaths
British Army generals of World War II
British Army personnel of the Russian Civil War
British Army personnel of World War I
Companions of the Order of the Bath
Graduates of the Royal Military College, Sandhurst
Graduates of the Staff College, Quetta
Grand Officers of the Order of Orange-Nassau
Knights Commander of the Royal Victorian Order
Military Knights of Windsor
People from Kimberley, Northern Cape
Recipients of the Military Cross
Royal Scots Fusiliers officers
South African knights
South African people of British descent
British Army major generals
South African emigrants to the United Kingdom